Pelagibacterium lixinzhangensis is a Gram-negative, non-spore-forming and rod shaped bacterium from the genus of Pelagibacterium which has been isolated from desert soil from the Xinjiang province in China.

References

Hyphomicrobiales